The 1979 Penn Quakers football team represented the University of Pennsylvania in the 1979 NCAA Division I-A football season.

Schedule

References

Penn
Penn Quakers football seasons
College football winless seasons
Penn Quakers football